The Diocese of Povardarie, also known as the Vardar Diocese, is a diocese of the Macedonian Orthodox Church. It covers the municipalities: Veles, Kavadarci, Negotino, Valandovo, Bogdanci, Demir Kapija and Gevgelija. It is headed by Metropolitan Agatangel.

List of churches and monasteries in the Povardarie 
Monastery of St. George – Pološki Monastery, near Kavadarci
St John the Baptist – Veterski Monastery, near Drenovo
The Most Holy Theotokos, Veles area
Monastery of St Demetrios, Veles
Monastery of St Nicholas – Mokliški Monastery, near Kavadarci
Cave Church of St Mark, Kavadarci area
, village of Drenovo

References
 The Vardar Diocese at mpc.org.mk

Macedonian Orthodox dioceses
Veles Municipality
Valandovo Municipality
Bogdanci Municipality
Demir Kapija Municipality
Gevgelija Municipality
Dioceses in North Macedonia